Sylvie Fréchette,  (born 27 June 1967 in Montreal, Quebec) is a Canadian former synchronised swimmer. She is the 1992 Olympic champion in the women's solo event.

Career
Fréchette competed in the women's solo at the 1992 Summer Olympics. In the technical figures routine, a Brazilian judge accidentally entered a score of 8.7 instead of 9.7, costing her first place; after several appeals by the Canadian Olympic Committee, her medal was upgraded to gold. Kristen Babb-Sprague, the beneficiary of the judge's error, was allowed to keep her gold medal.

Fréchette's success in the pool continued with a silver medal in the women's team event at the following Olympics. In 1999, she was inducted into Canada's Sports Hall of Fame. She has also contributed as a swimmer, designer, and coach to the synchronized-swimming portions of Cirque du Soleil's water-based stage production O, which opened in 1998 at the Bellagio hotel and casino in Las Vegas.

In 2006, Fréchette became an ambassador for Oxfam.

Fréchette ran for the Conservative Party of Canada in the 2019 Canadian federal election, as the party's candidate in the Quebec riding of Rivière-du-Nord. She came in third and, after the election, ascribed her loss to party leader Andrew Scheer's inability to take a stance on abortions.

Personal life
Sylvie Frechette was engaged to her business partner Sylvain Lake, who committed suicide a week before the 1992 Games. Lake was a television track analyst and former 400m track athlete.

Electoral record

See also
 List of members of the International Swimming Hall of Fame

References

External links
 
 
 Canada's Sports Hall of Fame profile
 International Swimming Hall of Fame profile
 Library and Archives Canada - Sylvie Fréchette

1967 births
Canadian synchronized swimmers
French Quebecers
Living people
Olympic gold medalists for Canada
Olympic silver medalists for Canada
Olympic synchronized swimmers of Canada
Recipients of the Meritorious Service Decoration
Swimmers from Montreal
Synchronized swimmers at the 1992 Summer Olympics
Synchronized swimmers at the 1996 Summer Olympics
Olympic medalists in synchronized swimming
Medalists at the 1992 Summer Olympics
Medalists at the 1996 Summer Olympics
World Aquatics Championships medalists in synchronised swimming
Synchronized swimmers at the 1986 World Aquatics Championships
Synchronized swimmers at the 1991 World Aquatics Championships
Pan American Games silver medalists for Canada
Commonwealth Games medallists in synchronised swimming
Commonwealth Games gold medallists for Canada
Pan American Games medalists in synchronized swimming
Synchronized swimmers at the 1987 Pan American Games
Medalists at the 1987 Pan American Games
Synchronised swimmers at the 1986 Commonwealth Games
Synchronised swimmers at the 1990 Commonwealth Games
Canadian sportsperson-politicians
Medallists at the 1986 Commonwealth Games
Medallists at the 1990 Commonwealth Games